Rick Cunningham may refer to:

Rick Cunningham (American football) (born 1967), American football player
Rick Cunningham (ice hockey) (born 1951), ice hockey player

See also
Richard Cunningham (disambiguation)